

Qualification system
As with previous editions of the Games, A/B qualifying times will be used, with a target number of 276 swimmers. Times need to be swum in an approved meet sometime between January 1, 2014 and May 1, 2015. A total of 36 open water swimmers will also qualify (18 per gender).

Swimming qualification times
The time standards (all long course) for the 2015 Pan American Games are:

Open Water

Qualification timeline

Summary

Qualified swimmers

References

P
P
Qualification for the 2015 Pan American Games
Swimming at the 2015 Pan American Games
Swimming competitions in the Americas